Acer oliverianum, common names Oliver's maple and Oliver maple, is broadleaf deciduous tree. It is a species of maple.

Description
Acer oliverianum has a smooth bark that is jade green in colour, with fine white waxy stripes. It grows up to 20 meters  wilderness areas of Taiwan but usually only grows to 5 to 8 meters when cultivated. It has more or less horizontal branches, and looks similar to Acer palmatum the Japanese Maple.

The leaves are opposite and simple being 6 to 10 cm across, with base truncate or cordate. The leaves are 5-lobed and palmate. The lobes are ovate, the middle lobe having 5 to 8 pairs of lateral veins with minor veins finely reticulate.

Flowers are whitish with five purplish sepal . They have five white petals and eight stamen that are longer than the petals.

The fruit are glabrous ranging from 2.5 to 3 cm long that spread at a wide angle.

Distribution
Acer oliverianum is found in forests and valleys at elevations of 1000 to 2000 metres. It has been found only in Taiwan and China, in the Provinces of Anhui, Fujian, southern Gansu, Guizhou, Henan, Hubei, Hunan, Jiangxi, Shaanxi, Sichuan, Yunnan, and Zhejiang.

Gallery

References

External links

oliverianum
Plants described in 1889
Endemic flora of China